Gokulathil Seethai may refer to:
 Gokulathil Seethai (film), a 1996 Indian Tamil film
 Gokulathil Seethai (2008 TV series), aired on Kalaignar TV
 Gokulathil Seethai (2019 TV series), airing on Zee Tamil